Devjibhai Govindbhai Fatepara (b. 20 November 1959, Kankot) is a member of the 16th Lok Sabha of India. He represented the Surendranagar constituency of Gujarat and is a member of the Bharatiya Janata Party political party.

He was the Member for the Halvad constituency of the Gurarat Legislative Assembly from 2007 to 2012.

References 

Living people
1958 births
People from Surendranagar district
Lok Sabha members from Gujarat
India MPs 2014–2019
Bharatiya Janata Party politicians from Gujarat